is an unofficial name of what was thought to be a previously uncharted island in the Arctic Ocean, discovered in August 2021. It is within the Arctic Circle, off of the northern tip of Greenland, and consists primarily of seabed mud and moraine, an accumulation of unconsolidated debris left behind by glaciers. One theory as to its creation was that it was formed relatively recently, during a violent storm. 

In September 2022, Danish researcher René Forsberg, head of geodynamics at the National Space Institute in Denmark, announced that further research had shown Qeqertaq Avannarleq "unequivocally" is not an island, but the top of a grounded iceberg, covered by a layer of soil, pebbles and mud, likely deposited by from glaciers in the area.

This gravel bank has been among the candidates to be recognized as the northernmost point of land. An undisputed candidate, Kaffeklubben Island is classified as permanent, being discovered in 1900 A.D., and being 750 metres (2,460 ft) farther north than Cape Morris Jesup, the northernmost point of mainland Greenland. All candidates north of Kaffeklubben Island are the matter of dispute.

Initially, scientists were out to visit Oodaaq, a similar formation discovered in the 1970s that also is among those in contention to be the northernmost point of land. (Forsberg's 2022 research said Oodaaq is also the top of a grounded iceberg.) The scientists proposed the unknown island be called "Qeqertaq Avannarleq", Greenlandic for "the northernmost island".

The realization that scientist had found a new landmass went as follows: when photographs of a landing on Qeqertaq Avannarleq were posted to social media, a group of hobbyist adventurers known as 'island hunters' prompted further investigation. Morten Rasch of the University of Copenhagen department of geosciences and natural resource management contacted an expert at the Technical University of Denmark (DTU). "Together with DTU, we realized that my GPS had erred, leading us to believe that we were on Oodaaq. In fact, we had just discovered a new island further north, a discovery that ever so slightly expands the Kingdom", explained Rasch. The location was confirmed later by the GPS on the helicopter that was used by the group to reach the island.

It is likely that Qeqertaq Avannarleq is a "short-lived islet", however, research is still pending. "No one knows how long it will remain. In principle, it could vanish as soon as a powerful new storm hits", Rasch stated. In 2021, Rene Forsberg, head of geodynamics at the National Space Institute in Denmark, said Qeqertaq Avannarleq "meets the criteria of an island", though he noted that "these small islands come and go".

See also
 Kaffeklubben Island
 Northernmost point of land
 List of islands of Greenland

References

Uninhabited islands of Greenland
Icebergs
Phantom islands